Holøydalen Church is a parish church of the Church of Norway in Tolga Municipality in Innlandet county, Norway. It is located in the village of Øversjødalen. It is the church for the Holøydalen parish which is part of the Nord-Østerdal prosti (deanery) in the Diocese of Hamar. The brown, wooden church was built in a long church design in 1908 using plans drawn up by the architect Victor Nordan. The church seats about 130 people.

History
It took a long time before progress was made. In 1892, a cemetery was built just outside Øversjødalen. A small bell tower was built at the cemetery too. About 10 years later, planning began for a new chapel at the cemetery. Plans for the chapel were made by Victor Nordan. The new wooden building was consecrated on 8 July 1908. Originally, it was an annex chapel, but it was later upgraded to the status of parish church.

Media gallery

See also
List of churches in Hamar

References

Tolga, Norway
Churches in Innlandet
Long churches in Norway
Wooden churches in Norway
20th-century Church of Norway church buildings
Churches completed in 1908
1908 establishments in Norway